Vandré Sagrilo Monteiro (born July 3, 1979 in Santiago, Rio Grande do Sul, Brazil) is a Brazilian footballer. He formerly played as an attacking midfielder for Hong Kong First Division League clubs Happy Valley and South China.

He is known in Brazil as Vandré but in Hong Kong as Monteiro.

Career statistics

Club career
As of February 3, 2007

References

External links
Vandré Sagrilo Monteiro at HKFA
Profile at HVAACLUB.com
Profile at CBFNEWS.com 

1979 births
Living people
Brazilian footballers
Brazilian expatriate footballers
Association football forwards
Grêmio Esportivo Brasil players
Criciúma Esporte Clube players
Happy Valley AA players
Brazilian expatriate sportspeople in Hong Kong
South China AA players
Hong Kong First Division League players
Expatriate footballers in Hong Kong
Association football midfielders
Hong Kong League XI representative players